is a railway station in the city of Nakano, Nagano, Japan, operated by the private railway operating company Nagano Electric Railway.

Lines
Entoku Station is a station on the Nagano Electric Railway Nagano Line and is 23.3 kilometers from the terminus of the line at Nagano Station.

Station layout
The station consists of one ground-level island platform connected to the two story station building by a level crossing. The station is unattended.

Platforms

Adjacent stations

History
The station opened on 26 March 1923. The station was relocated 300 meters towards Shinshūnakano Station in 1994 and the station building rebuilt in 1993 for the 1998 Winter Olympics.

Passenger statistics
In fiscal 2015, the station was used by an average of 132 passengers daily (boarding passengers only).

Surrounding area
Shinpei Nakayama Memorial Museum

See also
 List of railway stations in Japan

References

External links

 

Railway stations in Japan opened in 1923
Railway stations in Nagano Prefecture
Nagano Electric Railway
Nakano, Nagano